Vorotnikov is a Russian masculine surname, its feminine counterpart is Vorotnikova. Notable people with the surname include:

Ilya Vorotnikov (footballer, born 1986), Kazakh football player
Ilya Vorotnikov (footballer, born 2001)
Vitaly Vorotnikov (1926–2012), Soviet politician and diplomat

Russian-language surnames